The 3rd Louisiana Regiment Native Guard Infantry was a regiment in the Union Army during the American Civil War.

Port Hudson
The unit was organized at New Orleans, Louisiana, November 24, 1862, and remained there until May 1863. Between May and July, the regiment was involved in the Siege of Port Hudson.

Corps d'Afrique
The designation was changed to 3rd Regiment, Corps d'Afrique June 6 at Port Hudson. The Confederate garrison at Port Hudson surrendered on July 9, five days after the fall of Vicksburg farther up the Mississippi River.

United States Colored Troops
The unit designation was changed once again to the 75th United States Colored Troops on April 4, 1864. The 75th participated in the Red River Campaign with engagements at the Battle of Mansura on May 16 and the Battle of Yellow Bayou on May 18.

The regiment remained on duty in southern Louisiana for the remainder of the war and mustered out November 25, 1865.

See also
Port Hudson order of battle
List of Louisiana Union Civil War units
List of United States Colored Troops Civil War units

References

External links
Union Regimental Histories – Corps De Afrique

Native Guard, 003
Louisiana Native Guard, 003
Military units and formations established in 1862
1862 establishments in Louisiana
Military units and formations disestablished in 1865